Events from the year 1534 in Sweden

Incumbents
 Monarch – Gustav I

Events

 2 February – Sweden joins the Count's Feud to support the Danish throne claimant Christian against the Lübeck -supported Christian II. 
 - The King's brother-in-law John VII of Hoya, vassal of Viborg, joins the enemy Lübeck in the ongoing Counts Feud. 
 - The Pagan holy well at Sånga is destroyed on the order of Laurentius Petri.
 31 October – Halmstad is taken by the Swedish army.
 - The monarch conquers Viborg in the province of Finland from his brother-in-law John of Hoya, who supported Lübeck, and thereby crushes the Hanseatic influence in Finland. John of Hoya flees to Estonia. 
 - The Thaler is introduced in Sweden.
 Dissolution of Riseberga Abbey: the former nuns move to Germany.

Births

Deaths

References

 
Years of the 16th century in Sweden
Sweden